Heinrich von Knöringen (5 February 1570 – 25 June 1646) was Prince-Bishop of Augsburg from 1599 to 1646.

Biography

Heinrich von Knöringen was born in Nesselwang on February 5, 1570, the son of Johann Christoph von Knöringen.  He took the minor orders in 1586 and three years later he began the study of law at the University of Ingolstadt.  In 1590, he transferred to the Collegium Germanicum.

He became a deacon in Augsburg on September 15, 1595.  On April 19, 1599, the cathedral chapter of Augsburg Cathedral elected him to be Prince-Bishop of Augsburg.  He was ordained as a priest in May 1599.  On June 13, 1599, Johann Konrad von Gemmingen, Bishop of Eichstätt, consecrated him as a bishop.

His time as Bishop of Augsburg largely overlapped with the Thirty Years' War (1618–1648).  He supported the decision of Ferdinand II, Holy Roman Emperor to issue the Edict of Restitution in 1629.  From 1632 to 1635 and in 1645 the Thirty Years' War forced him to flee the Prince-Bishopric of Augsburg; he took refuge in Reutte, Hall in Tirol, and Innsbruck at various times.

He died in Dillingen an der Donau on June 25, 1646.

References

1570 births
1646 deaths
Roman Catholic bishops of Augsburg